"Don't Mess with My Man" is a song by American R&B singer Nivea featuring Brian and Brandon Casey from R&B group Jagged Edge. It was released in on June 3, 2002, as the third single from her self-titled debut album (2001). The song peaked at number eight on the Billboard Hot 100 and was an international hit as well, reaching the top 10 in France and New Zealand and receiving a gold certification in the former country.

In the United Kingdom, the song was released twice: once as a solo single in 2002—reaching number 41 on the UK Singles Chart—and again as a double A-side with "Laundromat" in 2003, reaching number 33 on the same chart. The recording earned the artists a nomination for Best R&B Performance by a Duo or Group with Vocals at the 45th Grammy Awards in 2003.

Music video
Nzingha Stewart directed a music video for an alternate version of the song, which premiered in June 2002. The video's background singers featured clothing from Hendricks Apparel Group's Raw Jean collection.

Track listings

Solo release

US CD single
 "Don't Mess with My Man" (main version) – 3:35
 "Don't Mess with My Man" (version 2) – 3:35
 "Don't Mess with the Radio" (video)
 "Don't Mess with My Man" (video)

UK CD single
 "Don't Mess with My Man" (main version) – 3:36
 "Don't Mess with My Man" (album version) – 3:36
 "Check Your Man" (featuring Mystikal) – 3:47
 "Don't Mess with My Man" (video) – 3:36

UK 12-inch single
A1. "Don't Mess with My Man" (main version) – 3:36
A2. "Don't Mess with My Man" (album version) – 3:36
B1. "Check Your Man" (featuring Mystikal) – 3:47

European CD single
 "Don't Mess with My Man" (main version) – 3:36
 "Don't Mess with My Man" (album version) – 3:36

Australian CD single
 "Don't Mess with My Man" (Bryan-Michael Cox remix) – 3:54
 "Don't Mess with My Man" (Burn Unit remix featuring Mystikal) – 3:54
 "Don't Mess with My Man" (version 1 main clean) – 3:36
 "Don't Mess with My Man" (Allstar remix featuring Petey Pablo) – 3:46

2003 UK re-release

UK CD single
 "Laundromat" (radio edit) – 4:25
 "Don't Mess with My Man" (remix) – 3:52
 "Laundromat" (instrumental) – 4:23
 "Laundromat" (video)

UK 12-inch single
A1. "Laundromat" (radio edit)
A2. "Laundromat" (instrumental)
AA1. "Don't Mess with My Man" (remix)

Charts

Weekly charts

Year-end charts

Certifications

Release history

References

2002 singles
2002 songs
Jive Records singles
Nivea (singer) songs
Songs written by Bryan-Michael Cox